Dominick Browne may refer to:

 Sir Dominick Browne (c. 1585 – c. 1656) Irish merchant and landowner
 Dominick Browne (mayor), mayor of Galway (1688–1689)
 Dominick Browne, 1st Baron Oranmore and Browne (1787–1860), Irish politician
 Dominick Browne, 4th Baron Oranmore and Browne (1901–2002), Anglo-Irish politician
 Dominick Browne, 5th Baron Oranmore and Browne (born 1929), playwright and poet